Anti-Aircraft is a two-player fixed shooter released in arcades by Atari, Inc in 1975. The game was also released as Anti-Aircraft II, denoting the two-player aspect of the game.

Gameplay
Planes fly overhead, either singly or in pairs, in random directions in the aircraft flight area. The object is to shoot down more planes than the player's opponent during the time limit.

Each player controls an anti-aircraft gun located in the lower left and right corners of the screen, respectively.  A player's gun is controlled by three buttons located in each player's control station, which consists of a button for moving up, down, and firing. The up and down buttons move the gun to any one of three predefined positions.

Reception

Legacy

A home console port was included in the game cartridge, Air-Sea Battle, one of the launch titles for the Atari VCS in 1977.

References

Arcade video games
1975 video games
Atari arcade games
Fixed shooters
Discrete video arcade games
North America-exclusive video games
Video games developed in the United States